Torsten Herbst (born 22 August 1973) is a German politician of the Free Democratic Party (FDP) who has been serving as a member of the Bundestag from the state of Saxony since 2017.

Early life and education 
Herbst grew up in the Dresden district of Zschertnitz, attended the polytechnic secondary school "Gottfried Semper" and later the grammar school Dresden-Plauen. He did his community service in a hospital. Afterwards, he started studying economics at the Dresden University of Applied Sciences where he graduated with a degree in International Business Studies.

Political career 
Torsten Herbst was a founding member of the Young Liberal Action Saxony (Jungliberale Aktion Sachsen, JuliA) in the post-reunification period and its state chair from 1997 to 2000. He was elected deputy state chair of the FDP Saxony in 1999, was secretary general of the FDP Saxony from 2005 to 2019, and has been its treasurer since 2019. Since 2019, he has also been a member of the federal executive committee of the FDP.

In 1999, Herbst was elected deputy state chairman of the FDP in Saxony, and from 2005 to 2019, he was secretary general of the state association, under the leadership of chairman Holger Zastrow. From 2004 to 2014, he was a member of the State Parliament of Saxony.
 
Herbst became a member of the Bundestag in the 2017 German federal election. He has since been serving on the Committee on Transport and Digital Infrastructure. Since 2019, he has also been a member of the federal executive committee of the FDP, under the leadership of chair Christian Lindner.

In the negotiations to form a so-called traffic light coalition of the Social Democratic Party (SPD), the Green Party and the FDP following the 2021 German elections, Herbst was part of his party's delegation in the working group on economic affairs, co-chaired by Carsten Schneider, Cem Özdemir and Michael Theurer.

Other activities 
 Federal Network Agency for Electricity, Gas, Telecommunications, Posts and Railway (BNetzA), Member of the Rail Infrastructure Advisory Council

References

External links 

  
 Bundestag biography 

 

1973 births
Living people
Members of the Bundestag for Saxony
Members of the Bundestag 2021–2025
Members of the Bundestag 2017–2021
Members of the Bundestag for the Free Democratic Party (Germany)